Wiehlea is a monotypic genus of European sheet weavers containing the single species, Wiehlea calcarifera. It was first described by R. Braun in 1959, and is only found in Europe.

See also
 List of Linyphiidae species (Q–Z)

References

Linyphiidae
Monotypic Araneomorphae genera